Escobar Cemetery is a cemetery in Gresham, Oregon, established in 1914.

According to Metro, the cemetery is named after Frank Escobar and was acquired by Multnomah County in 1957.

As of 2014, the cemetery continues to be operated by Metro.

See also

 Gresham Pioneer Cemetery
 White Birch Cemetery

References

1914 establishments in Oregon
Cemeteries in Oregon
Gresham, Oregon